Gánt is a village in Fejér county,Hungary with approximately 600 inhabitants. The location is known for its history of bauxit mining. The village has history reaching back to many centuries. After the Tatar and turkish occupation the area was uninhabited, thus king Josef II. relocated peasants from Austria to work on the agrarian lands. The village kept the German toung until the end of the 2nd world War, when the nativ german tounged inhabitants were deported to Germany. This event was a great pain for the village and many people still commemorate the evet and the victims were regular visitors of the village after the fall of Iron curtain. The village is also part of the blue hiking track in Hungary, so many tourists are visiting and passing this small gem in the Vertes mountains.

External links 

 Street map 

Populated places in Fejér County